Jammerbergia is an extinct genus of mastodonsauroid temnospondyl within the family Mastodonsauridae. The only species is Jammerbergia formops, named in 2003 from the Cynognathus Assemblage Zone of South Africa.

References

Triassic temnospondyls of Africa
Fossil taxa described in 2003